The Moldovan National Division is the top-tier professional basketball league of Moldova.

A notable player has been Ulhas Koravi Satyanarayan, one of the league's topscorers of the 2021-22 season.

Current teams (2021-22)

Latest finals

References

External links
Moldovan Basketball Federation
Moldovan league on Eurobasket

Basketball leagues in Europe
Basketball in Moldova